Hallgrímsson is a surname of Icelandic origin, meaning son of Hallgrímur. In Icelandic names, the name is not strictly a surname, but a patronymic. The name refers to:
Asgeir Örn Hallgrimsson (b. 1984), Icelandic professional handball player
Geir Hallgrímsson (1925–1990), Icelandic politician; Prime Minister of Iceland 1974–78; mayor of Reykjavík 1959–72
Hafliði Hallgrímsson (b. 1941), Icelandic composer
Jónas Hallgrímsson (1807–1845), Icelandic poet and author
Hallgrim Eagle Hallgrimsson, fictional police officer from the Danish TV Series The Eagle: A Crime Odyssey
Heimir Hallgrímsson, an Icelandic football manager and former player
Matthías Hallgrímsson (born 1946), Icelandic footballer

Icelandic-language surnames